William Odell may refer to:
William Odell (cricketer), English cricketer
William Hunter Odell, Canadian lawyer, judge, and politician
William Odell (MP), Irish member of parliament for Limerick

See also
Billy O'Dell (William O'Dell), baseball player